Aleksandr Valeryevich Kudryavtsev (born 9 June 1990) is a former Russian professional football player.

Club career
He made his Russian Football National League debut for FC Shinnik Yaroslavl on 18 April 2010 in a game against FC Mordovia Saransk. That was his only season in the FNL.

External links
 
 
  Career profile at sportbox.ru
 

1990 births
Living people
Russian footballers
Russia youth international footballers
Association football midfielders
PFC CSKA Moscow players
FC Shinnik Yaroslavl players
FC Tyumen players
FC Gornyak Uchaly players
FC Tekstilshchik Ivanovo players